The Kingdom of Western Georgia was a late medieval de facto independent fragmented part of the Kingdom of Georgia that emerged during the Mongol invasions of the realm, led by King David VI Narin in 1259 and later followed by his successors. Over the decades, the monarchy would fall into chaos and transform into a federation of autonomous principalities unruly of the central or regional royal power and authority.

Most of the occasions, realm would be reannexed into unified fold by the eastern Georgian kings. Nevertheless, the unified Georgian realm would de jure collapse in 1490, and western Georgia would secure an independent future under the name of Kingdom of Imereti, that will exist til 1810.

Name of the realm
The question of the contemporaneous name of the realm between 1259 to early 1400s remains without a concrete answer because from the end of the 15th century, Western Georgia extended from the modern-day city of Sochi in the north to Trebizond in the south and the Likhi Range in the east. The chronology of the adoption of this name for this state is not clear and it is plausible that some monarchs before 1490 fragmentation would style themselves as "Kings of Imereti", however, it may well be an anachronism and that an actual change of the title would happen much later.

Indeed, upon 1259 independence pushed by King David VI Narin, he would continue to be styled as David VI, king of united Georgia. Modern historians, such as the former head of the historical department of the Tbilisi State University, Professor Nodar Asatiani justifies the naming of the realm as the Kingdom of Western Georgia until the 15th century, demonstrating that the rulers of that fragmented state considered themselves a legitimate line of the Georgian kings who protected the Georgian nation during the Muslim invasions and were fiercely fighting for the unity. French historian Marie-Félicité Brosset also attributes the creation of the distinctive kingdom of Imereti under that name to the first coronation of King Bagrat VI in 1463.

List of kings
 David VI Narin, 1259-1293
 Constantine I (son), 1293-1327
 Michael (brother), 1327-1329
 Bagrat I (son), 1329-1330
1330-1386: Reunification of Georgia
 Alexander I (son of Bagrat I), 1387-1389
 George I (brother), 1389-1392
1392-1396: Reunification of Georgia
 Constantine II (son of Bagrat I), 1396-1401

References

Bibliography
 Brosset, Marie-Félicité (1849) Histoire de la Géorgie, depuis l'Antiquité jusqu'au XIXe siècle - 1re partie, Saint Petersburg Academy of Sciences
 Brosset, Marie-Félicité (1856) Histoire de la Géorgie depuis l'Antiquité jusqu'au XIXe siècle, Histoire moderne II, Saint Petersburg Academy of Sciences, .
 Rayfield, Donald (2012) Edge of Empires, a History of Georgia. Londres: Reaktion Books. .
 Frédéric Dubois de Montpéreux (1999) Voyage autour du Caucase, chez les Tcherkesses et les Abkhazes, en Colchide, en Géorgie, en Arménie et en Crimée, Volume 1, Soukhoumi, Adegi Graphics LLC, 
1259 establishments in Europe
1401 disestablishments in Europe
13th-century establishments in the Kingdom of Georgia
14th century in the Kingdom of Georgia
15th-century disestablishments in the Kingdom of Georgia